Semotivirus is the only genus of viruses in the family Belpaoviridae (formerly included in the family Metaviridae). Species exist as retrotransposons in a eukaryotic host's genome. BEL/pao transposons are only found in animals.

Species 

The genus contains the following species:
 Anopheles gambiae Moose virus
 Antheraea semotivirus Tamy
 Ascaris lumbricoides Tas virus
 Bombyx mori Pao virus
 Caenorhabditis elegans Cer13 virus
 Drosophila melanogaster Bel virus
 Drosophila melanogaster Roo virus
 Drosophila semotivirus Max
 Drosophila simulans Ninja virus
 Schistosoma semotivirus Sinbad
 Takifugu rubripes Suzu virus

References 

 Frame IG, Cutfield JF, Poulter RTM (2001) New BEL-like LTR-retrotransposons in Fugu rubripes, Caenorhabditis elegans, and Drosophila melanogaster. Gene 263(1–2):219–230

External links

 ICTVdB Index of Viruses
 Descriptions of Plant Viruses
 

Ortervirales
RNA reverse-transcribing viruses
Virus genera